Anand Prasad Dhungana (Nepali: आनन्द प्रसाद ढुँगाना) is a Nepali politician of Nepali Congress. He served as Minister in at various point of time. He is also central committee member of Nepali Congress. He is also served as member of the 1st Constituent Assembly and 2nd Constituent Assembly from Nepali Congress party.

Electoral history 
Dhungana remained victorious in 1990, 1994 and 1999 election. He gained win over two former deputy PMs Raghubir Mahasheth and Ishwor Pokhrel in 1990 and 1999 respectively. In 2017, he couldn't win as Deepak Karki of Nepali Congress joined FSF-N to give candidacy.

2017 legislative elections

Election in the 1990s

1999 legislative elections

1994 legislative elections

1991 legislative elections

See also 

 Bimalendra Nidhi 
 2022 Janakpur municipal election
 Ram Krishna Yadav
 Mahendra Yadav

References 

Nepali Congress politicians from Madhesh Province
Living people
People from Dhanusha District
Nepalese Hindus
Nepali Congress (Democratic) politicians
Tribhuvan University alumni
Nepal MPs 2017–2022
Nepal MPs 1991–1994
Nepal MPs 1994–1999
Nepal MPs 1999–2002
Government ministers of Nepal
1950 births
Members of the 2nd Nepalese Constituent Assembly